Amnon Jackont (born 1948 in Ramat Gan) is an Israeli author of thrillers, a historian and a literary editor.

Jackont was allowed to postpone his military service for law studies at the Hebrew University of Jerusalem. During the summer breaks he would serve in the military, but was injured and became disabled. He stopped his studies and became a successful businessman, active in real estate, investments and insurance. From 1980 he writes next to his business endeavours. Almost all his books became bestsellers. From 1988 he worked as a literary editor for the Keter Publishing House.

In 1997 Jackont ceased his business activities to concentrate on his own writing and editing and on his history studies at the Tel Aviv University. After completing his masters (2002), he has completed his PhD degree at the same university (2006).

Since 2002 he is also active in business and relationship counseling, in workshops and TV programs. Some of these are conducted with his wife, radio show hostess Varda Rasiel-Jackont. Amnon and Varda Jackont live in Tel Aviv.

Trojan horse exposure
In 2005, Jackont helped expose an industrial espionage ring involving executives at several major Israeli corporations. During the previous year, he had noticed excerpts from an unpublished manuscript appearing in internet forums, followed by a series of harsh reviews once the book was actually published. He also determined that his email was being read and manipulated by someone else.

When a computer technician found that the problem was a Trojan horse program on his computer, Jackont reported the matter to police. The person responsible was eventually identified as Michael Haephrati, the ex-husband of Varda's daughter from a previous marriage, who had apparently written the Trojan horse. The same program was identified as having been used by three private detective agencies to collect information from the espionage victims on behalf of their competitors.

Bibliography

Hebrew
Pesek-Zeman (Borrowed Time) (Israel: Am Oved, 1982) .
Malkodet Devash (Honey Trap) (Israel: Keter Publishing, 1984) .
Ish ha-sagrir: Sifre penai (The Rainy-Day Man) (Israel: Am Oved, 1987) .
Aharon ha-meahavim ha-hakhamim (Last of the Wise Lovers) (Israel: Keter Publishing, 1991) .
Mukhan le-hayim: Sipurim: Keter ketsarim (Ready for Life: Stories) (Israel: Keter Publishing, 2000) .
Mavo Le-Ahava (Introduction to Love) (Israel: Keter Publishing, 2001)
 With Varda Rasiel Jacont: Shin Kmo Sheker (L as in Lies) (Israel: Keter Publishing, 2004)
Hidath Moti (The Riddle of my Death) (Israel: Keter Publishing, 2009)
Over Va-Shav (Resurgence - A financial documentary story) (Israel: Yedioth Aharonoth Books, 2009)
Meir Amit – Ha-ish ve-ha-Mosad (Meir Amit - A Man and Mossad) (Israel: Yedioth Ahronoth Books, 2012)

English
Borrowed Time (UK: Hamish Hamilton, 1986) (USA: Trafalgar Square, 1988)

References
Amon Jackont at the Lexicon for New Israeli Literature
Amonon Jackont at the Institute for translated Israeli literary authors

Israeli novelists
1948 births
Living people
Hebrew University of Jerusalem Faculty of Law alumni
Tel Aviv University alumni
Literary editors
Thriller writers
Book editors
Israeli historians
Israeli people of Belgian-Jewish descent
People from Ramat Gan
Israeli editors